Thomas J. Geraghty (April 10, 1883 – June 5, 1945), was an American screenwriter. He wrote for 70 films between 1917 and 1939. During the 1930s he went to the United Kingdom, where he wrote a number of screenplays. He was born in Rushville, Indiana, and died in Hollywood, California. In April 1924, Geraghty was credited with coining the soon-to-be-popular vaudeville pun, "The Thief of Badgags".

Selected filmography

 One Dollar Bid (1918)
 Her Inspiration (1918)
 The Turn of a Card (1918)
 With Hoops of Steel (1918)
 A Heart in Pawn (1919)
 The Courageous Coward (1919)
 When the Clouds Roll by (1919)
 In for Thirty Days (1919)
 The Mollycoddle (1920)
 Hollywood (1923)
 The Sporting Venus (1925)
 Wild, Wild Susan (1925)
 The Big Noise (1928)
 Three-Ring Marriage (1928)
 Weary River (1929)
 The Church Mouse (1934)
 No Limit (1935)
 Debt of Honour (1936)
 Two's Company (1936)
 Keep Your Seats, Please (1936)
 She Knew What She Wanted (1936)
 Wings of the Morning (1937)
 Shipyard Sally (1939)

References

External links

1883 births
1945 deaths
American male screenwriters
People from Rushville, Indiana
Screenwriters from Indiana
20th-century American male writers
20th-century American screenwriters